Automatic Tracking Satellite Dishes are satellite dishes used while a vehicle, boat or ship is in motion. Automatic tracking satellite dishes utilize gyroscopes, GPS position sensors, and uses unique satellite identification data and an integrated DVB decoder to aid in identification of the satellite that it is pointing at.

The dishes consist usually of stepper motors to drive and aim the dish, gyroscopes to detect changes in position while the vehicle is in motion, a parabolic reflector, low-noise block converter, and control unit.

They can use also shifted Phased arrays. (example: Starlink Dish).

Manufacturers 
 Winegard Company
 KVH Industries
 Sea Tel
 Orbit Technology Group
 Ten-Haaft
 SpaceX: Starlink Dish

See also
 USALS = Universal Satellites Automatic Location System
 DiSEqC = Digital Satellite Equipment Control
 SAT>IP end user consumer equipment that can switch different ip streams from different SAT>IP servers and facilitates selection of reception from different satellites
 Duo LNB
 Monoblock LNB
 DiSEqC
 Motor-driven Satellite dish
 Starlink Dish
 6°oF
 Phased array

References

Radio frequency antenna types
Satellite broadcasting
Antennas (radio)